Persaudaraan Setia Hati Terate (widely known as PSHT or SH Terate) is a sports and pencak silat organization from East Java, Indonesia, created by Ki Hadjar Hardjo Oetomo in 1922 and was later agreed to be renamed to Persaudaraan Setia Hati Terate at its first congress in Madiun in 1948.

PSHT is one of the martial arts organizations that founded Ikatan Pencak Silat Indonesia (IPSI) on 18 May 1948. Currently PSHT has around 7 million members, has branches in 236 regencies/cities in Indonesia, 10 overseas commissariats in Malaysia, Netherlands, Russia (Moscow), East Timor, Hong Kong, South Korea, Japan, Belgium, and France.

History 
In 1903, Ki Ageng Soerodiwirjo laid the groundwork for a pencak silat Setia Hati style in Tambak Gringsing village, Surabaya, Indonesia. Previously, he called the martial arts style as "Djojo Gendilo Tjipto Muljo" with the brotherhood system called "Sedulur Tunggal Ketjer". In 1917, he moved to Madiun and establish Persaudaraan Setia Hati in Winongo village, Madiun, Indonesia.

In 1922, Ki Hadjar Hardjo Oetomo, a follower of the Setia Hati style from Pilangbango, Madiun, ask permission of Soerodiwirjo to establish a martial arts school with the Setia Hati style. Soerodiwirjo agreed with this idea as long as the school later had to have a different name. Finally, Oetomo formed SH PSC (Persaudaraan Setia Hati "Pemuda Sport Club"). This education system was then called Persaudaraan Setia Hati Terate or PSHT in 1948 during the first congress in Madiun.

Notable members 
 Ki Hadjar Hardjo Oetomo
 Edhie Baskoro Yudhoyono
 Hartanto Edhie Wibowo
 Richard Simorangkir
 Imam Nahrawi (honor of the pendekar)
 Herman Deru (honor of the pendekar)
 Totok Imam Santoso
 Andjar Wiratma (honor of the pendekar)
 Istu Hari Subagio (honor of the pendekar)

Gallery

See also 
 Pencak silat
 Indonesian martial arts

References

External links 

Silat
Indonesian martial arts